Michał Kondracki (5 October 1902 – 27 February 1984) was a Polish composer. His work was part of the music event in the art competition at the 1932 Summer Olympics.

References

1902 births
1984 deaths
Polish composers
Olympic competitors in art competitions
Musicians from Poltava
Polish emigrants to the United States